Ralph Barton Perry (July 3, 1876 in Poultney, Vermont – January 22, 1957 in Boston, Massachusetts) was an American philosopher. He was a strident moral idealist who stated in 1909 that, to him, idealism meant "to interpret life consistently with ethical, scientific, and metaphysical truth." Perry's viewpoints on religion stressed the notion that religious thinking possessed legitimacy should it exist within a framework accepting of human reason and social progress.

Career
He was educated at Princeton (B.A., 1896) and at Harvard (M.A., 1897; Ph.D., 1899), where, after teaching philosophy for three years at Williams and Smith colleges, he was instructor (1902–05), assistant professor (1905–13), full professor (1913–30) and Edgar Pierce Professor of Philosophy (1930–46). He was president of the American Philosophical Association's eastern division in 1920–21.

A pupil of William James, whose Essays in Radical Empiricism he edited (1912), Perry became one of the leaders of the New Realism movement. Perry argued for a naturalistic theory of value and a New Realist theory of perception and knowledge. He wrote a celebrated biography of William James, which won the 1936 Pulitzer Prize for Biography or Autobiography, and proceeded to a revision of his critical approach to natural knowledge. An active member among a group of American New Realist philosophers, he elaborated around 1910 the program of new realism. However, he soon dissented from moral and spiritual ontology, and turned to a philosophy of disillusionment. Perry was an advocate of a militant democracy: in his words "total but not totalitarian". Puritanism and Democracy (1944) is a famous wartime attempt to reconcile two fundamental concepts in the origins of modern America. Between 1946 and 1948, he delivered in Glasgow his Gifford Lectures, titled Realms of Value.

He married Rachel Berenson, and they lived in Cambridge, Massachusetts. Their son was Edward Barton Perry born at their home 5 Avon Street in Cambridge, 27 September 1906. In 1932, Edward married Harriet Armington Seelye (born Worcester, Massachusetts, 28 May 1909), daughter of physician and surgeon Dr. Walker Clarke Seelye of Worcester and Annie Ide Barrows Seelye, formerly of Providence, Rhode Island.

In 1919, he gave the commencement address for the first graduating class of Connecticut College, which had opened its doors in 1915.

Bibliography

 The Approach to Philosophy, (1905), New York, Chicago and Boston: Charles Scribner's Sons
 The Moral Economy, (1909), New York: Charles Scribner's Son
 Present Philosophical Tendencies: A Critical Survey of Naturalism, Idealism, Pragmatism, and Realism, together with a Synopsis of the Philosophy of William James, (1912), New York:Longmans, Green & Co.
 Holt, EB; Marvin, WT; Montague, WP; Perry, RB; Pitkin, WB; Spaulding, EG, The New Realism: Cooperative Studies in Philosophy, (1912), New York: The Macmillan Company
 The Free Man and the Soldier, (1916), New York: Charles Scribner's Sons
 The Present Conflict of Ideals: A Study of the Philosophical Background of the World War, (1918), New York: Longmans, Green & Co.
 Annotated Bibliography of the Writings of William James, (1920), Longmans, Green & Co.
 The Plattsburg movement: A Chapter of America's Participation in the World War (1921), New York: E.P. Dutton & company
 A Modernist View of National Ideals (1926) Berkeley: University of California Press, Howison Lectures in Philosophy, 1925
 General Theory of Value (1926)
 Philosophy of the Recent Past: An Outline of European and American Philosophy Since 1860, (1926), New York: Charles Scribner's Sons
 The Hope for Immortality (1935)
 The Thought and Character of William James, 2 vols. (1935)
 Plea for an Age Movement (1942) New York: The Vanguard Press [Talk at 1941 Princeton and Harvard Reunions]
 Puritanism and Democracy, (1944)
 Characteristically American: Five Lectures Delivered on the William W. Cook Foundation at the University of Michigan, November–December 1948, (1949), New York: Alfred A. Knopf, 1949
 Realms of Value, (1954), Harvard University Press [Based on Gifford Lectures]
 The Humanity of Man, (1956), New York: George Braziller
 "A Definition of morality". In P. W. Taylor (Ed.), Problems of moral philosophy: an introduction to ethics (pp. 13–24). Belmont, CA: Dickenson, 1967

See also
 American philosophy
 List of American philosophers

References

External links 

 Biography, at the Gifford Lectures site
 
 
 
 Some works by and about Perry, in the Mead Project website
 "PROF. ROYCE'S REFUTATION OF REALISM AND PLURALISM", The Monist 12 (1901-2): 446–458.
 Review: The Refutation of Idealism, Reviews, The Journal of Philosophy, Vol. I, No. 3 (Feb. 4, 1904), 76–77.
 THE EGO-CENTRIC PREDICAMENT, Journal of Philosophy, Psychology, and Scientific Methods 7 (1910): 5-14
 Editor’s Preface, Essays in Radical Empiricism (1912) by William James
 Lectures on the Harvard Classics. The Harvard Classics, Volume LI (1914):
 Philosophy: I. General Introduction
 Philosophy: III. The Rise of Modern Philosophy
 Philosophy: IV. Introduction to Kant
 Religion: I. General Introduction
 Non-Resistance and the Present War--A Reply to Mr. Russell, International Journal of Ethics, Vol. 25 No. 3 (April, 1915). 307–316.

1876 births
1957 deaths
20th-century American biographers
20th-century American economists
20th-century American essayists
20th-century American historians
20th-century American male writers
20th-century American philosophers
20th-century educational theorists
American bibliographers
American bibliophiles
American book and manuscript collectors
American educational theorists
American educators
American ethicists
American historians of philosophy
American male essayists
American male non-fiction writers
American philosophy academics
American political philosophers
Analytic philosophers
Epistemologists
Harvard University alumni
Harvard University faculty
Literacy and society theorists
Metaphysicians
Metaphysics writers
Ontologists
People from Poultney (town), Vermont
Philosophers of culture
Philosophers of economics
Philosophers of education
Philosophers of history
Philosophers of mind
Philosophers of pessimism
Philosophers of religion
Philosophers of science
Philosophers of social science
Philosophers of war
Presidents of the American Philosophical Association
Princeton University alumni
Pulitzer Prize for Biography or Autobiography winners
Scholars of American education
Social philosophers
Theorists on Western civilization
Writers about activism and social change
Writers about religion and science
Writers from Massachusetts
Writers from Vermont
Members of the American Academy of Arts and Letters